XLR may refer to:

 XLR connector, an electrical connector commonly used in audio equipment
 Cadillac XLR, a retractable hardtop convertible automobile
 Megas XLR, an American animated television series
 X-linked recessive inheritance
 XLR-8, a roller coaster
 XL programming language runtime

See also